Just Friends is a 2018 Dutch romantic comedy television film directed by Ellen Smit, starring Majd Mardo and Josha Stradowski. The film was shown on opening night of the Perth International Queer Film Festival and won the Audience Award after showing at the MIX Milano International Lesbian and Gay Film Festival. It premiered on BNNVARA on 7 March 2018.

Synopsis
Joris is a 21 & 1/2 year old nouveau riche Dutch man trying to come to terms with loss of his father 10 years back. His strong willed, conservative, and slightly racist mother is no help. Simone is caught up in her own emotions over her philandering late husband. Meanwhile, Yad, a 26 year old Syrian refugee whose family settled in the Netherlands is employed to do chores for Joris' grandmother Ans. He has returned from Amsterdam after “Amsterdam was too fun. My studies too boring” to live with his family “temporarily”. Yad has his own issues with his traditional upbringing, his dream to be a surfing instructor, running his own business goes against the expectation he continue his studies in medicine.

Despite different ages, backgrounds, and lifestyles there is an instant spark between the two. Drawn together through music and sports, mainly surfing their feelings for each other grow, they become more than "just friends".

Their mothers, Simone and Maryam, threaten to jeopardize their relationship. Due to the pressure Yad and Joris have a falling-out. Things turn better after; their mothers realize “you do not control love, love controls you”, Joris reconciles with the loss of his father, and Yad finds the courage to embrace what he loves.

Cast
 Majd Mardo as Yad
 Josha Stradowski as Joris
 Jenny Arean as Ans
 Tanja Jess as Simone
 Melody Klaver as Moon
 Mohamad Alahmad as Elias
 Nazmiye Oral as Maryam
 Elène Zuidmeer as Fientje
 Roscoe Leijen as Gerlof
 Sjoerd Dragtsma as Mitch
 Younes Badrane as Trainer
 Stan Gobel as Young Joris
 Renske Hettinga as Young Moon
 Anne Prakke as Bart
 Sonia Eijken as Lely
 Malcolm Hugo Glenn as Erwin
 Tessa du Mee as Crematory clerk
 Justin Mooijer as Yad's friend

References

External links
 

2018 LGBT-related films
2018 romantic comedy films
Comedy television films
2010s Dutch-language films
Dutch LGBT-related films
Dutch romantic comedy films
Dutch television films
Films shot in the Netherlands
Gay-related films
LGBT-related romantic comedy films
LGBT-related television films
Romance television films
2018 films